Daranagama Kusaladhamma Thero (29 July 1963 – 3 March 2018) was a Sri Lankan Sinhalese Buddhist monk who founded the first Sri Lankan Buddhist media network and the television channel, The Buddhist. He served as the chief incumbent of the Colombo Sri Sambodhi Viharaya and the Sambodhi Community Development Foundation in London. He died on 3 March 2018 at the age of 54.

Biography 
Daranagama Kusaladhamma Thero was born on 29 July 1963 in Daranagama. He got the prefix name of "Daranagama" which was his birthplace. He educated at the Royal College, Colombo and received his master's degree at the University of Kelaniya.

Buddhist TV network 
He went onto launch The Buddhist media network on 15 May 2011 with The Buddhist radio transmission. Ven. Daranagama Kusaladhamma Thero was instrumental in launching Sri Lanka's first primary Buddhist channel in January 2012 under the title The Buddhist.

Death 
After suffering from illness, Daranagama Kusaladhamma Thero died on 3 March 2018 when he was 54 years old. His funeral took place at the Sports Ministry Ground at the Independence Square.

As a result of his death, the annual Big Match between Royal College and St. Thomas College. which is known as Royal-Thomian clash (Battle of the Blues), was postponed to 9 March 2018 as he was a past pupil of the Royal College.

See also
Buddhism in Sri Lanka
The Buddhist
Shraddha TV
Global Buddhist Network

References 

1963 births
2018 deaths
Sri Lankan Buddhist monks
Sri Lankan Theravada Buddhists
Alumni of Royal College, Colombo